Ceriagrion aeruginosum is a species of damselfly in the family Coenagrionidae.
Its common name is redtail. It is found in Indonesia, the Moluccas, New Guinea, Australia and possibly the Solomon Islands.

Its natural habitats are freshwater swamps, ponds and slow moving streams. The adult is a medium-sized damselfly (wingspan 50mm, length 45mm) mostly red with the synthorax becoming pale green as it matures. In Australia, the distribution is in suitable habitat in the north-west and north-eastern part of the continent from about Broome to the south-eastern Queensland border. The taxon has been assessed as least concern 3.1 in the IUCN Red List.

Gallery

See also
 List of Odonata species of Australia

References

External links

Coenagrionidae
Odonata of Australia
Insects of Australia
Taxa named by Friedrich Moritz Brauer
Insects described in 1869
Damselflies